Li Chong may refer to:

 Li Chong (General) (李崇), Protector-General of the Western Regions, Qin Dynasty
  (李充), courtesy name Daxun (大遜), Eastern Han dynasty official
  (李充), courtesy name Hongdu (弘度), Eastern Jin poet and literary thinker.
 Li Chong (Tang dynasty) (李沖; died 688), Tang dynasty prince who resisted Wu Zetian
 Li Chong (EastEnders), fictional character in the BBC soap opera EastEnders